Günther Hubertus von Reibnitz (8 September 1894 – 2 March 1983) was a cavalry officer in the German army during the First World War. He joined the Nazi Party in 1930 and was a member of the SS Cavalry Corps.

Reibnitz married four times and was the father of Princess Michael of Kent. Two of his grandchildren, Lord Frederick Windsor and Lady Gabriella Windsor, are in the line of succession to the British throne. They are also great-grandchildren of King George V.

Life
Reibnitz was a member of an ancient Reibnitz family, Silesian landowners, whose first recorded ancestor Henricus de Rybnicz was mentioned already in 1288. Günther was the son of Baron Hans Egon von Reibnitz (1856–1918), who, on 19 February 1887 had married Baroness Ida von Eickstedt (1867–1937), a member of the von Eickstedt family, in Gieraltowitz, Upper Silesia. Reibnitz was born on 8 September 1894 at Mistitz in the Prussian province of Silesia, now called Miejsce Odrzańskie, having since become part of Poland. He was educated at the Royal Prussian Military Academy at Berlin-Lichterfelde, from which he graduated at the end of 1913.

Commissioning
In March 1914 he was commissioned as an ensign into the Grand Duchy of Mecklenburg 2nd Regiment of Dragoons, No. 18, in Parchim. In August 1914, soon after the beginning of the First World War he was severely wounded and captured, remaining a prisoner of war of the French for most of the duration of the war. On 20 September 1918, shortly before Reibnitz was released in exchange for a French officer, his father died in Berlin.

Post-First World War
After the war, in the lead-up to the plebiscite to resolve competing German and Polish territorial claims in Upper Silesia, Reibnitz and his brother Joachim founded two regiments of German irregulars, aiming to guard the border on the River Oder from Cosel to Ratibor.

First marriage
On 12 Jul 1921, Reibnitz married firstly Margherita von Seherr-Thoss (1893–1962), the widow of Friedrich Ernst Graf von Seherr-Thoss (1881–1918), and a daughter of Gustav Schoen by his marriage to Elisabeth Wentzel. Thereafter, he took over the management of her estate of Długomiłowice in Upper Silesia. Their daughter Margarita was born there on 18 January 1924. After separating from his wife, Reibnitz established a farm at Hahnenvorwerk, near Silverberg in Silesia, breeding animals for the fur trade. In 1933, this activity ended when he was appointed to the honorary position of Regional Director of Hunting for Silesia. On 1 December 1930 Reibnitz joined the Nazi Party, becoming member number 412855. On 15 April 1933 he then became a member of the Cavalry SS, with the SS number 66010. 

Reibnitz and his first wife were divorced at Breslau on 15 April 1931. On 15 July 1937, his mother died at Groß-Grauden, Silesia, now Grudynia Wielka in Poland.

Second World War
As an officer of the Army Reserve, Reibnitz was recalled to active service at the beginning of the Second World War. However, he was not a very loyal party member. In 1937 he had been summoned to appear before the highest party tribunal accused of denigrating the swastika flag. By reaffirming his loyalty, he was able to extract himself from the affair; he had also referred to the leader of the SS, Heinrich Himmler, as the "chicken farmer". Soon after he rejoined the armed forces on active service, Reibnitz was sent back to the home front due to heart problems. He informed the SS of his marriage (on 17 December 1941 in Breslau) to his second wife Countess Maria Anna Szapáry von Muraszombath, Széchysziget et Szapár (1911–1998), a daughter of the Austro-Hungarian diplomat Count Frigyes Szapáry (1869–1935), but he did not inform them of his intention to seek an annulment of his first marriage so that he could marry his second wife in a Roman Catholic ceremony, nor that the children of the marriage would be raised in that faith. This was interpreted by the regime as disloyalty. It was also seen as incriminating that he and his wife practiced their faith openly. Because his wife was already under observation by the Gestapo over her contacts before the war with supposed British Secret Service agents, as well as in connection with a range of essentially minor "transgressions", his situation became increasingly critical, and in 1944 he was dismissed from the Nazi Party, from the Cavalry SS, and from the post of Regional Director of Hunting for Silesia.
On 16 November 1942, Reibnitz's son Friedrich was born in Breslau, and on 15 January 1945 his daughter Marie Christine (the later Princess Michael of Kent) was born in Karlsbad (now Karlovy Vary in the Czech Republic), near the estate of her maternal grandmother Princess Hedwig of Windisch-Graetz (1878–1918), a daughter of Alfred III, Prince of Windisch-Grätz.

After the war
In the confusion towards the end of the war, Reibnitz managed to avoid being transferred, on the personal orders of Himmler, to the Dirlewanger special unit, and was able to find refuge with his old army regiment. 

In May 1945, following the war's end, Reibnitz avoided captivity by Soviet forces and made his way to Bavaria. There he was detained by the US military, investigated and was eventually classified by the Appeals Tribunal for Upper Bavaria (14 May 1948) as a "nominal party member", "not a member of any organization condemned as criminal in the Nuremberg judgment" and "equivalent to a non-accused person".

Reibnitz's second marriage ended in divorce in 1946. In 1950 his former wife moved with her children to Australia. Reibnitz lived first in Munich, where he worked in the fur trade and then in insurance. In 1950 he moved to South Africa to open his own insurance business.

Later marriages
On 12 May 1950 in Johannesburg Reibnitz married Esther Schütte (born 1909). The marriage ended in divorce on 12 July 1956 in Pretoria, after he had decided to become a farmer in Mozambique. On 15 December 1956, in Umtali, Southern Rhodesia, Reibnitz's fourth marriage was to Rosemarie von 
Buddenbrock (1907–1999), the widow of Baron Gustav von Buddenbrock (1907–1955) and before that of Ulrich Otto Hoesch (1899–1941), who was a daughter of Alois Karl Kramer. He developed his wife's farm at Maforga and made it economically productive. As the widow of Gustav von Buddenbrock, his wife is called Baroness Rosemarie von Buddenbrock in some sources.

1976 retirement
In 1976 Reibnitz retired to Germany, while his wife travelled between Germany and Mozambique and continued to manage the farm. He spent his old age in Hemmingen and died on 2 March 1983 in Breitbrunn am Chiemsee in Bavaria. His grave is in Garmisch-Partenkirchen. In 1986 his widow returned to Germany on health grounds and left the farm to neighbouring Christian missionaries. She died on 30 November 1999 in Marquartstein, Bavaria. Maforga continues to this day as a mission.

Margarita, Reibnitz's daughter from his first marriage, married Charles Jacques Francisco in Sharon, Connecticut, on 14 September 1947.

On 30 June 1978 in Vienna, Reibnitz had attended the civil wedding of his daughter Marie Christine to Prince Michael of Kent. He became the grandfather of Lord Frederick Windsor (born in 1979) and Lady Gabriella Windsor (born in 1981). On 30 June 1979 in Sydney, Reibnitz's only son Frederick married secondly Helen Rodda Williams, daughter of Sir Bruce Rodda Williams KBE, Professor and Vice-Chancellor of the University of Sydney.

Nazism
In 1985 details became public for the first time concerning Reibnitz's role at the time of Nazism. A biography of Elizabeth II by John Parker states that by the end of the Second World War, the Berlin Documents Centre had held a dossier on Reibnitz said to be four inches thick. Writer Barry Everingham stated that "historians at the Yad Vashem Institute in Jerusalem claimed that the baron was planted in the SS to act as Goering's spy". However, Everingham's source for this has been questioned.

Notes

External links
Günther-Hubertus Freiherr von Reibnitz pedigree, genealogics.org

1894 births
1983 deaths
People from Kędzierzyn-Koźle County
People from the Province of Silesia
German Army personnel of World War I
Prussian Army personnel
University of Vienna alumni
SS officers
Barons of Germany
Nobility in the Nazi Party
von Reibnitz family